Football Mountain is a mountain,  high, with a prominent and peculiar rock scar called The Football on its north side, on the ridge between Edisto Inlet and Tucker Glacier in Antarctica. It was occupied as a survey station, and marked by a large rock cairn, by the New Zealand Geological Survey Antarctic Expedition, 1957–58, who named it for The Football.

The pass Football Saddle is the easiest way to cross by sledge.

References 

Mountains of Victoria Land
Borchgrevink Coast